Branding is an easy and economical way to permanently mark anything that burns (wood, leather, plastic, rubber, cork, food, soap, wax, etc). This is done by either a fire-heated tool or an electrically-heated tool, which is pressed onto the object, leaving behind a mark with the shape of the impressed tool.

The act or art of marking/engraving wood by branding with a heated tool is associated with pyrogravure.

The United States Occupational Safety and Health Administration warns that, “Breathing these particles may cause allergic respiratory symptoms, mucosal and non-allergic respiratory symptoms, and cancer.”

See also
Livestock branding
Marking axe

References

Woodworking